Toroq (also Romanized as Ţoroq; also known as Sadd-e Ţoroq and Turuq) is a village in Sarjam Rural District, Ahmadabad District, Mashhad County, Razavi Khorasan Province, Iran. At the 2006 census, its population was 23,491, in 5,943 families.

References 

Populated places in Mashhad County